Johannes Aal (c. 1500 – 28 May 1553) was a Swiss Roman Catholic theologian, composer and dramaturg.

Aal was born in Bremgarten, Switzerland, and was pastor there until 1529, then Leutpriester in Baden until 1536. At the collegiate church of Solothurn, he became preacher and choir leader in 1538. From 1544 to 1551, he was provost of the college of canons, where he died.

He is the author of the tragedy Johannes der Täufer (St. John Baptist), first performed in 1549 in Bern. The piece is a folk play in two days with four acts each. It includes burlesques, romantic scenes and satirical elements. Its satire derides all classes and the court as well as curiosity, passion for finery, loquacity and the art of seduction of women.

As a musician, he composed a tune in 16 verses on  Saint Maurice and  Saint Ursus of Solothurn.

Further reading
Gombert, Ludwig: Johannes Aals Spiel von Johannes dem Täufer und die älteren Johannesdramen. In: Germanistische Abhandlungen, 31. Hildesheim, New York 1977 (Nachdruck der Ausg. Breslau 1908).
Kully, Elisabeth: "Das ältere St. Ursenspiel". In: Jahrbuch für Solothurner Geschichte 55 (1982), S. 1–107.
Meyer, Ernst (Hg.): Tragoedia Johannis des Täufers von Johannes Aal in Solothurn, 1549. Halle an der Saale 1929 (=Neudrucke deutscher Litteraturwerke des 16. und 17. Jahrhunderts, 263–267).
Ukena-Best, Elke: "Aal, Johannes". In: Literaturlexikon, edited by Walther Killy Bd. 1, S. 25.

Sources
Allgemeine Deutsche Biographie - online version

1500s births
1553 deaths
People from Bremgarten, Aargau
16th-century Swiss Roman Catholic theologians
Swiss dramatists and playwrights
Male dramatists and playwrights
Swiss male writers
Swiss composers
Swiss male composers
16th-century composers